Peyvand or Paiwand may refer to:
 Peyvand-e Kohneh
 Peyvand-e Olya